Ava Moore is a fictional character on the FX Networks television series Nip/Tuck. Played by Famke Janssen, the character was introduced during the show's second season.

Background
Ava Moore is a trans woman who worked as a professional escort to wealthy older women. Avery was in love with Dr. Barrett Moore (Alec Baldwin) and used his charisma to convince his wealthy female dates to finance Moore's medical research.

However, to Ava's growing disappointment, Barrett Moore was a confirmed heterosexual and refused to advance his friendship with Ava to a romantic relationship. Ava fell into a deep depression and, determined to have Moore's love at any cost, asked the doctor to perform sex reassignment surgery on her. Intrigued, Moore agreed and personally undertook the mission of transforming her “male body” into Ava. Moore's skill as a surgeon allowed him to turn Ava into what Christian Troy would later describe as “The Hope Diamond of transsexuals; completely flawless in every way”. Ava was happy with her new form and the two married. But problems quickly popped up, as Moore could never truly accept Ava as being a woman, and instead treated her like his prized creation. Ava sank further and further into depression. Moore arranged for one of his female employees to become pregnant with his child, so Ava could become a mother and hopefully pull the three together as a family.

Ava grew increasingly distant from her husband and ultimately took their child and left in the middle of the night – right before the final surgery was to be performed to make her vagina deep enough to pass as biologically natural. She then began taking young lovers, since Ava believed that younger, sexually inexperienced boys would not be able to tell that her genitals were different from those of most women.

Character history

Season 2
Ava Moore was introduced at the beginning of season two as a life coach who is hired by plastic surgeon Sean McNamara to "motivate" his emotionally distant wife Julia into becoming a better wife to him. Sean's attraction to Ava blinds him to who she truly is: a devious, calculating sexual predator who targets, manipulates and exploits the emotionally weak for her own amusement. Upon meeting Julia, she finds that Julia's distance comes from her attraction to Sean's best friend and business partner Christian Troy, as well as the recent revelation that Christian is the father of her firstborn son, Matt. From there, Ava moves on to Matt and seduces the teenager into a sexual relationship. The relationship is met with scorn from Ava's own teenage son, Adrian. It is ultimately revealed that Ava's sexual predation extends to her own son, who is jealous of the attention his mother gives to Matt.

When Matt's relationship with Ava is exposed, Ava uses the truth about Matt's paternity to try to silence Julia, but the truth ultimately comes out. Matt moves in with Ava and continues to act out on his anger at his parents. His delinquency is also influenced by his friendship with Adrian, who was molded long ago into a sociopath by his mother's sexual abuse. When Adrian tries to expose Ava, she reveals, that she is not Adrian's biological mother; she told Matt that she and her “son” had a prior conversation about the abuse ending in sex (with Ava clearly guilty about the incest and Adrian begging for his “mother” to “make love” to him) the shock of these revelations causes Adrian to run away and Ava becomes more and more depressed and withdrawn from Matt.

At the end of the second season, Ava has a confrontation with Christian Troy over her relationship with Matt. During the confrontation, Ava begins taunting Christian sexually, and they begin to have sex. During the penetration, Christian realizes that Ava has an extremely shallow vaginal canal and had to be a transsexual. Researching Ava's history to confirm the revelation, Christian and Sean discover her past by speaking to Barrett Moore.

Confronted with the truth, Ava expected the truth about her to be exposed further. But, the three are sympathetic towards her, and together strike a deal in which they would help arrange for Moore to complete the final surgery on Ava's genitals in exchange for Ava breaking off her relationship with Matt, as they fear his reaction to her true identity.

The surgery is successful and Ava breaks up with Matt. At first, Ava tries to be cruel in order to create a clean break, but Matt refuses to back down. Ava then explains to Matt that she couldn't stay with him because their relationship had awakened personal demons that she has to face on her own.

Hours later, as Ava prepares to leave the country, Adrian confronts his mother with a knife. After an intense exchange, Adrian turns the knife on himself and commits suicide. The last scene of Adrian is on Ava's floor, where it left to be assumed by the viewer that Ava leaves her adopted son's body to rot. She boards a plane to Paris very shortly after.

Season 3
As of the end of the third season, Ava remains in France and has yet to return to the United States. However, the character does make a brief appearance in season three, through use of deleted scenes of Ava and Matt making love (which were edited to appear as a dream sequence) and a scene where Matt, having learned the truth, imagines Ava appearing before him; in the dream, she curses him for hating her and demands that he come to terms with the fact that he still loves her even if she was born a man.

Season 6
Ava reappeared in Los Angeles to seek out the help of Sean and Christian. She wants them to perform surgery on her baby, Raphael, that she claims to have adopted. The doctors refuse and say they will send her a list of referrals. When she was asked about Barrett Moore, Ava says that a series of strokes ultimately led to his death. She goes to Sean's house one night and talks to him about how he doesn't need Christian's approval for the surgery. Initially, it seems Sean had reconsidered. He asks Ava for all of Raphael's medical records. However, it turns out that Ava stole the baby because she wouldn't be given the baby with her background, and she felt terrible for the conditions that Raphael was living under. Sean then refuses to perform the surgery and throws her out.

Ava then tracks down Matt after seeing his wedding invitation at Sean's apartment. She gives him and Ramona a check for an apparently large but unspecified amount of money as a wedding gift and says she is trying to make up for all the bad things she has done. She also meets Matt's daughter, Jenna, for the first time. Matt meets Ava later and gives back the check, saying that he and Ramona feel uncomfortable accepting it. Ava invites Matt in for a drink and the two sleep together. Ava then tells Matt that he should forget that she came back into his life. He then goes to Sean and Christian and asks them again to perform the surgery on Raphael.

On Matt's wedding day, he gets a text from someone, presumably Ava. He goes outside of Ramona's house, where Ava is meeting him with a limo. He gets in and Ava rolls up the window as Sean watches the limo drive off.

In the next and final episode of the series, it is seen that Ava and Matt have left together. Matt tells Sean and Christian that they plan on leaving to Brazil to find a suitable surgeon to perform the surgery on Raphael. Christian later finds Ava and tells her that he will perform the surgery on the condition that she ends her relationship with Matt and leaves. Ava expresses that she really does love Matt, but Christian still believes that she is just using him.

While Christian and Sean are performing the surgery, Ava tells Matt that she doesn't want to have anything to do with him and that she never loved him. This devastates Matt. When the surgery is completed, Ava notices that Raphael still has marks on his face. Sean tells her that there will need to be more procedures for the next few years, and there will be some permanent scarring. Ava tells him that she wants Raphael to be perfect, but Sean says that nothing is ever perfect. She later tells him that her father told her that to be different is to lead a life of pain and persecution. She didn't want to see Raphael experience the same thing that she went through. Furthermore, she leaves the hospital in tears, leaving Raphael in the room.

Later on, she is getting ready to leave and Matt approaches her with Jenna in the airport. He says he has bought tickets, and he wants to go with her wherever she is going. Ava still says that she doesn't love him, but Matt says he can see “the smoke” in her eyes. He tells her that even though he has messed up, Jenna is a very good daughter, and she needs a good mother that she can look up to. He also goes on to say, that he has always loved her and will always love her. Ava agrees or seems to agree to be with Matt. The three of them are later seen going up the escalator, seemingly getting ready to start their life together.

References 

Nip/Tuck characters
Fictional transgender women
Television characters introduced in 2004
Fictional child abusers
Fictional characters involved in incest
Fictional LGBT characters in television